The 2015–16 Pacific Tigers men's basketball team represented the University of the Pacific during the 2015–16 NCAA Division I men's basketball season. They played their home games at the Alex G. Spanos Center and were members of the West Coast Conference. The Tigers were led by third-year head coach Ron Verlin. On December 12, 2015, Verlin was suspended indefinitely amid an NCAA investigation. Assistant coach Mike Burns was named the interim head coach for the remainder of the season. The Tigers also self-imposed a postseason ban for 2016 which included the WCC Tournament. They finished the season 8–20, 6–12 in WCC play to finish in a three-way tie for seventh place

On March 3, 2016, it was announced that Ron Verlin was no longer employed by the university. Interim coach Mike Burns was also released from his employment with the school.

On March 16, the school announced that Damon Stoudamire would be the new head coach.

Previous season 
The Tigers finished the 2014–15 season 12–19, 4–14 in WCC play to finish in a tie for ninth place. They lost in the first round of the WCC tournament to San Francisco.

Departures

Incoming Transfers

Recruiting Class of 2015

Allegations of academic fraud
On December 12, 2015 head coach Ron Verlin and assistant Dwight Young were suspended by the University after allegations of academic fraud came to light involving the two. Assistant coach Mike Burns was given the interim title. As a result of these allegations, the University placed a self-imposed postseason ban and also put on some scholarship restrictions.

Roster

Schedule and results

|-
!colspan=9 style=|Exhibition

|-
!colspan=9 style=| Regular season

References

Pacific Tigers men's basketball seasons
Pacific